Police is a dispersed settlement in the hills southwest of Gornja Radgona in northeastern Slovenia.

References

External links
Police on Geopedia

Populated places in the Municipality of Gornja Radgona